Vingtaine de Longueville is one of the four vingtaines of the parish of Grouville on the Channel Island of Jersey.

References

External links 
 Boundaries shown on OpenStreetMap

Longueville
Grouville
Jersey articles needing attention